Giacomo Mantegazza (1851 – January 25, 1920) was an Italian painter, known for painting Genre and Orientalist themes.

He was born in Saronno. He trained under Gerolamo Induno and Giuseppe Bertini. He was made an honorary member of the Brera Academy.
He died in Cernobbio.

Gallery

References

1851 births
1920 deaths
19th-century Italian painters
Italian male painters
20th-century Italian painters